The 1947 National League Division Two was the second post-war season of the second tier of motorcycle speedway in Great Britain. In the previous season, the league was known as the Northern League but the addition of Bristol Bulldogs and a third tier saw the name revert to the one used 8 years previously.

As well as Bristol Bulldogs, Wigan Warriors were new entrants bringing the total teams to 8. Middlesbrough Bears won the title. In fact the entire top five were unchanged from the previous season.

Norwich Stars 38-year-old rider Cyril Anderson died instantly on 16 August, during a best pairs event at Norwich. Anderson was leading when he skidded and was hit by a rider from behind  Remarkably another rider died the same day, 27-year-old Wembley rider Nelson 'Bronco' Wilson received fatal injuries in a National Trophy match.

Final Table Division Two

The British Speedway Cup for Division Two was run in a league format. Sheffield Tigers came out on top.

British Speedway Cup (Div 2) Final table

Top Five Riders (League only)

National Trophy
The 1947 Division 2 National Trophy (sponsored by the Daily Mail) was the Knockout Cup for Division 2 teams. Middlesbrough and Norwich qualified for the quarter finals of the main National Trophy by virtue of finishing 1st & 2nd.

First round

Semifinals

Final
First leg

Second leg

Middlesbrough were National Trophy Division 2 Champions, winning on aggregate 127–88.

See also
List of United Kingdom Speedway League Champions
Knockout Cup (speedway)

References

Speedway National League Division Two
1947 in British motorsport
1947 in speedway